The 1995–96 Copa México is the 66th staging of the Copa México, the 39th staging in the professional era.

The competition started on January 23, 1996, and concluded on March 6, 1996, with the Final, in which Tigres UANL lifted the trophy for second time ever with a 2-1 victory over Atlas.

For this edition was played by 32 teams, between Primera División and Primera División A.

Knock-out rounds

Semifinals

First legs

Second legs

Atlas won 4–3 on aggregate.
This game was played at Azteca stadium

Tigres UANL won 4-3 on aggregate.

Final

First legs

Second legs

Tigres UANL won 2-1 on aggregate.

Note
At the end of the regular season Tigres UANL was relegated to Primera División A

References
Mexico - Statistics of Copa México in season 1995/1996. (RSSSF)

Copa MX
Cup
1995–96 domestic association football cups